Dauphin is the surname of:

 Charles Dauphin (c. 1620–1677), French painter
 Chuck Dauphin (1974–2019), American music journalist
 Claude Dauphin (actor) (1903–1978), French actor
 Claude Dauphin (businessman) (1951–2015), French billionaire businessman
 Claude Dauphin (politician) (born 1953), Canadian politician
 François Dauphin (born 1953), Canadian handball player
 Jacques Dauphin (1923–1994), French advertising executive
 Laurent Dauphin (born 1995), Canadian ice hockey player
 Marc Dauphin (born 1960), Canadian military surgeon
 Max Dauphin (born 1977), Luxembourgian painter
 Robert Dauphin (1905–1961), French footballer
 Ronald Dauphin, Haitian activist and political prisoner